The 1934 World Table Tennis Championships – Corbillon Cup (women's team) was the first edition of the women's team championship. 

The cup was named the Corbillon Cup because it was named after Marcel Corbillon (the President of the French Table Tennis Association (FFTT) from 1933 to 1935) who donated the trophy for the winning team. Germany won the gold medal with a 5–0 record in the round robin group. Hungary won the silver medal and Czechoslovakia won the bronze medal.

Corbillon Cup results

Final table

See also
List of World Table Tennis Championships medalists

References

-
1934 in women's table tennis